Roshan Ara Begum (1917 – 6 December 1982) was a vocalist belonging to the Kirana gharana (singing style) of Hindustani classical music. She is also known by her honorific title Malika-e-Mauseeqi (The Queen of Music) and The Queen of Classical Music in both Pakistan and India.

Early life and training
Born in the Indian city of Kolkata in undivided India. She was the daughter of Abdul Haq Khan and Chanda Begum, and the cousin of Ustad Abdul Karim Khan, also of the Kirana gharana.

Born in Calcutta in 1917 CE, Roshan Ara Begum visited Lahore during her teens to participate in musical soirées held at the residences of affluent citizens of Chun Peer in Mohalla Peer Gillaanian at Mochi Gate, Lahore, British India (now in Pakistan). During her occasional visits to the city, she also broadcast songs from the then All India Radio station in Lahore and her professional name was announced as Bombaywali Roshan Ara Begum. She had acquired this popular nomenclature because she shifted to Mumbai, then known as Bombay, in the late 1930s, to live near her cousin Abdul Karim Khan, from whom she took lessons in Hindustani classical music for 15 years. In 1930s Roshan Ara was selected due to her singing as at time heroines were required to be trian in singing and she worked in four films in hindi, urdu and punjabi as leading lady.

A senior police officer in Bombay and a music lover, Chaudhry Ahmed Khan, approached her with an offer of marriage in 1944. Roshan Ara Begum consulted her tutor, Ustad Abdul Karim Khan, about it. She finally accepted the marriage offer on one condition that she would not have to give up her music after marriage. Her husband kept his promise and she continued to sing throughout her life. In Mumbai, she lived in a sprawling bungalow with her husband Chaudhry Ahmed Khan.

Career 
Melody was considered the most important feature of her singing.

Migrating to Pakistan in 1948 after the partition of India, Roshan Ara Begum and her husband settled in Lalamusa, a small town in Punjab, Pakistan from which her husband hailed. Although far away from Lahore, the cultural centre of Pakistan, she would travel back and forth to participate in music, radio and television programmes.

A widely-respected classical music patron of Pakistan, Hayat Ahmad Khan approached her and convinced her to become one of the founding members of All Pakistan Music Conference in 1959. To promote classical music, this organization continues to hold annual music festivals in different cities of Pakistan even today.

She was called "Malika-e-Mauseeqi" (Queen of Music) in Pakistan. She would wake up early in the morning and start her 'riyaz' (musical practice) after her morning religious prayers. She decided to adopt a boy and a girl since she herself remained childless.

Roshan Ara Begum also sang some film songs, mostly under music composers like Anil Biswas, Feroz Nizami and Tassaduq Hussain, for films such as Pehali Nazar (1945), Jugnu (1947), Kismet (1956), Roopmati Baazbahadur (1960) and Neela Parbat (1969).

Classical musicians Bade Fateh Ali Khan, Amanat Ali Khan of Patiala gharana and Ustad Salamat Ali Khan of Sham Chaurasia gharana used to listen to her recordings for their own enjoyment.

Personal life
Roshan Ara Begum was the cousin of Abdul Karim Khan later she married Chaudhry Ahmed Khan and she adopted two children.

Illness and death
She died due to cardiac arrest in Pakistan at Lahore on 6 December 1982 at the age of 65.

Awards and recognition
Roshan Ara Begum received the Sitara-e-Imtiaz Award or (Star of Excellence) Award and the Pride of Performance Award in 1960 from the President of Pakistan, and was the first female vocalist to be awarded the Sitara-e-Imtiaz.

Bibliography
 Kirana, by Roshan Ara Begum. Published by Gramophone Co. of India,

References

External links

Roshan Ara Begum on sarangi.info website
Roshan Ara Begum on Naeem Bukhari Show on YouTube

1917 births
Pakistani women singers
Hindi-language singers
Indian women ghazal singers
Women ghazal singers
Radio personalities from Lahore
Punjabi-language singers
Urdu-language singers
1982 deaths
Urdu playback singers
Muhajir people
Pakistani classical singers
Singers from Kolkata
Pakistani radio personalities
Bollywood playback singers
20th-century Indian actresses
Pakistani ghazal singers
Kirana gharana
Pakistani playback singers
20th-century Indian women classical singers
Recipients of Sitara-i-Imtiaz
Recipients of the Pride of Performance 
Women Hindustani musicians
Actresses in Urdu cinema
Women musicians from West Bengal
Indian film actresses
20th-century Indian women singers
20th-century Indian singers
Actresses in Punjabi cinema
Pakistani qawwali singers
20th-century Pakistani women singers
20th-century Khyal singers
Pakistani film actresses
Singers from Lahore
Actresses in Hindi cinema